Guadalmellato Reservoir is a reservoir in Adamuz, province of Córdoba, Andalusia, Spain.

In 2009, the Iberian lynx which had been on the verge of extinction was reintroduced into the area of the Embalse de Guadalmellato, resulting in a population of 23 in 2013.

See also 
 List of reservoirs and dams in Andalusia

References

External links 
 Agencia del agua Junta de Andalucía 
 Reservoirs status summary 
 Confederación Hidrográfica del Guadalquivir 

Reservoirs in Andalusia
Guadalquivir